Colin Charvis (born 27 December 1972) is a former captain of the Wales national rugby union team and also played for the British & Irish Lions. A back row forward, Charvis was equally adept as a flanker or as the no. 8.

Charvis became the world record try scorer for a forward in test match rugby on 24 November 2007 v South Africa at the Millennium Stadium, Cardiff with his 22nd international try. In 2011 he was overtaken by Takashi Kikutani of Japan on the List of leading rugby union test try scorers.

Charvis has two caps for the British & Irish Lions; both appearances were against Australia in 2001.

Early life
Charvis was born in Sutton Coldfield, Warwickshire, on 27 December 1972 to Lloyd and Lynne Charvis. Colin began his club career with London Welsh while studying at Polytechnic of Central London. He stayed at the club until 1995, when he moved to Swansea RFC. Charvis is of Jamaican heritage through his father.

1995-2003: Swansea

His first cap for Wales was in 1996 against Australia: he went on to become team captain for a period and toured Australia with the British & Irish Lions in 2001. He remained with Swansea until changes in the Welsh club structure saw him without a contract in the period of the 2003 Rugby World Cup.

2003-2007: Tarbes, Newcastle and Newport 

Charvis moved briefly to Tarbes in France and then to Newcastle Falcons in England whom he also captained.

Charvis's contract with the Falcons was not renewed at the end of the 2005–6 season. He subsequently joined the Newport Gwent Dragons. He made his debut for the club in August in a pre-season friendly against the Cornish Pirates

International career

Charvis scored 22 tries for his country, making him the leading try scorer among all Welsh forwards (as of 2021). He is also one of only four forwards to score over 100 international points (John Eales, Carlo Checchinato and Takashi Kikutani are the others). He was the second most capped player for Wales and the most capped forward with 94 caps until overtaken by Martyn Williams 13 March 2010. He also featured in the 1999 Rugby World Cup and captained Wales in the 2003 Rugby World Cup in Australia.

In 2000, Charvis was implicated in Grannygate as he had been first capped for Wales in 1996 while apparently ineligible. However, by the time the scandal broke he had completed the required 3 years residency period and no further action was taken. In 2015, a DNA testing project suggested that Charvis had genuine Welsh ancestry that he did not know about.

He appeared in both Tests and following the tour, Charvis was named in Gareth Jenkins' 41-man preliminary Rugby World Cup 2007 summer training squad. He made the final 30-man squad in August after playing in the Test against England and made substitute appearances in both Invesco Perpetual Summer Series matches against Argentina and France.

Charvis made a try-scoring substitute appearance in Wales's opening Pool B match against Canada, and made the starting line-ups for the remaining Pool clashes with Australia, Japan and Fiji.

In November 2007 Wales caretaker coach Nigel Davies included Charvis in his starting line-up for the inaugural Prince William Cup match with South Africa. Despite the 34–12 defeat to the reigning world champions Charvis scored his 22nd try for his country.

International tries

2008-2010: Player-coach

Charvis was appointed to a player/coach role at Newport Gwent Dragons in July 2008. However, because of injuries amongst the playing squad Charvis returned to the team, and as a result of his excellent form he played a number of matches during the 2008–09 season, but then retired as a player in order to be full-time forwards and defence coach. He parted company with the Dragons in late September 2010.

Post-professional career

Charvis is also one of eight celebrities chosen to participate in an intense week learning Welsh in an eco-friendly chic campsite in Pembrokeshire, West Wales in the series cariad@iaith:love4language shown on S4C in July 2011.

In 2012, Charvis made a cameo appearance as himself in an episode of the British television comedy drama series Stella.

In 2013, Charvis took on the Absa Cape Epic, an eight-day team stage race that traverses the Western Cape region of South Africa.  Having ridden over 700 km with 15,000m of vertical climbing, he completed the race as an Individual Finisher after his partner withdrew.

In 2018, commemorating Black History Month in the United Kingdom, Charvis was included on a list of 100 "Brilliant, Black and Welsh" people. 

From 2018 Charvis has owned a carpet shop in Horizon Park, Llansamlet, Swansea.

References

External links
Wales profile
Newport Gwent Dragons profile
Newcastle Falcons profile
Profile at Welsh Rugby Union website
Profile at Sporting Heroes

1972 births
Living people
Black British sportspeople
British & Irish Lions rugby union players from Wales
Dragons RFC players
English people of Jamaican descent
English people of Welsh descent
English rugby union players
London Welsh RFC players
Newcastle Falcons players
People educated at Queen Mary's Grammar School
Rugby union flankers
Rugby union players from Sutton Coldfield
Swansea RFC players
Wales international rugby union players
Wales rugby union captains